The 2017 Austin Peay Governors football team represented Austin Peay State University during the 2017 NCAA Division I FCS football season. The Governors, led by second-year head coach Will Healy, played their home games at Fortera Stadium and were members of the Ohio Valley Conference. They finished the season 8–4, 7–1 in OVC play to finish in second place.

Schedule

Source: Schedule

Game summaries

at Cincinnati

at Miami (OH)

Morehead State

at Murray State

UT Martin

Jacksonville State

at Tennessee State

Southeast Missouri State

at UCF

at Tennessee Tech

at Eastern Kentucky

Eastern Illinois

References

Austin Peay
Austin Peay Governors football seasons
Austin Peay Governors football